Damian Joseph Moss (born 24 November 1976) is a retired Major League Baseball left-handed pitcher.

Career
After making his Major League debut on 26 April, with the Atlanta Braves, Moss would also spend the  season in Atlanta, where he placed fifth in the National League Rookie of the Year award. While Moss excelled in his first season with the Braves, he subsequently struggled with inconsistency and poor control.

Moss has been traded twice, first from the Braves to the Giants with Merkin Valdéz for Russ Ortiz, and then, at the 2003 trading deadline, from the Giants to the Orioles with Kurt Ainsworth and Ryan Hannaman for Sidney Ponson.

Moss was suspended on 5 April 2005, while in the minor leagues for steroid use. He spent the entire season with the Triple A Tacoma Rainers, the Triple-A affiliate of the Seattle Mariners. Despite a solid season, he was not called up to the majors.

On 12 May 2006, Moss was signed by the Long Island Ducks of the independent Atlantic League. Moss was signed by the Atlanta Braves, but they released him after just three starts in the minors. (1-2, 10.12 ERA) Moss joined the Mayaguez Indios for the 2006/ Winter League season in Puerto Rico.

Though a non-roster invitee for the San Francisco Giants during 2007 spring training, Moss opted to leave camp on 18 February for personal reasons, thereby moving to voluntarily retirement status. Moss signed a minor league contract with the Atlanta Braves on 14 February 2008. Moss began the season as a starting pitcher for the Braves' Triple-A affiliate before being demoted to Double-A in June. He became a free agent at the end of the season.

After both playing and being on the pitching staff of the Colorado Springs Sky Sox in 2009, Moss was signed by the Colorado Rockies to a minor-league deal on 1 February 2010.

He was released and pitched for the Long Island Ducks during 2010 and retired after the 2010 season.

References

External links
, or Retrosheet
Venezuelan Professional Baseball League statistics

1976 births
2006 World Baseball Classic players
2009 World Baseball Classic players
Atlanta Braves players
Australian expatriate baseball players in the United States
Baltimore Orioles players
Bravos de Margarita players
Colorado Springs Sky Sox players
Danville Braves players
Durham Bulls players
Greenville Braves players
Living people
Long Island Ducks players
Louisville Bats players
Macon Braves players
Macon Music players
Major League Baseball pitchers
Major League Baseball players from Australia
Navegantes del Magallanes players
Australian expatriate baseball players in Venezuela
Richmond Braves players
San Francisco Giants players
Tacoma Rainiers players
Tampa Bay Devil Rays players
York Revolution players